Mcebisi Hubert Jonas (born 1960) is a former Deputy Finance Minister of the Government of South Africa who served from 2014 to 2016. He has also been a Member of the Executive Council for Economic Development and Environmental Affairs in the Eastern Cape province of South Africa under the Premier of the Eastern Cape Phumulo Masualle, and was a Member of the National Assembly of South Africa from 2014 to 2017.

He graduated from Vista University with a Bachelor of Arts in History and Sociology, and a Higher Diploma in Education from Rhodes University.

Jonas alleges that in 2015 the Gupta family offered him 600 million South African rand to be the next finance minister, as long as he followed their agenda.

In December 2019, Jonas was appointed as the Board Chairperson of South Africa's MTN Group, a South African multinational mobile telecommunications company.

Early life
Mcebisi Jonas was born in 1960 in Uitenhage in the Eastern Cape Province. He matriculated at Newewell High School in Port Elizabeth and achieved a Bachelor of Arts in History & Sociology at Vista University. He expanded his studies with a Higher Diploma in Education at Rhodes University. 

When Jonas was 14, he became active in politics. He led political activities in the Port Elizabeth area and started underground structures in the Eastern Cape and beyond. He was motivated by the politics of the Black Consciousness Movement in the early 1980s and was an organiser of AZASO (Azanian Students Organisation). He played an important role in the founding of the United Democratic Front (UDF) structures in the Eastern Cape. He was later sent into exile to finish military training in Angola and Uganda for the People’s Army, Umkhonto Wesizwe (MK). While in exile, he was hired by the United Nations to run an education program for the Mkhonto Wesizwe (MK) cadres. 

Upon his return in the '90s, Mr Jonas played a crucial role in creating the structures of the ANC and the SACP in the Eastern Cape. Identifying his outstanding skills, the ANC implemented him to form the new Provincial administration in the Eastern Cape in 1994. He was a member of the Eastern Cape ANC Provincial Executive Committee for two terms (1997-2004 and 2007-2009).Deputy Finance Minister

State Capture Report testimony
On 24 August 2018, during an inquiry into state capture, Mcebisi testified that the Gupta Family had informed him that former president Jacob Zuma does "whatever we say". A few days later, Finance minister Nene was fired.

References

https://www.gibs.co.za/news-events/events/forums/pages/deputy-finance-minister-mcebisi-jonas.aspx

1960 births
Living people
Rhodes University alumni
African National Congress politicians
Members of the National Assembly of South Africa
People from Uitenhage
Members of the Eastern Cape Provincial Legislature